KGCG-LP (93.9 FM) is a low-power FM radio station licensed to Blanchard, Oklahoma, United States. The station is currently owned by J&C Country Church, Inc.

History
The station call sign KGCG-LP on February 12, 2014.

References

External links

http://www.kgcgfmradio.com

GCG-LP
GCG-LP
2014 establishments in Oklahoma